Bonafide is the debut album by Jon B. It was released on May 23, 1995, on the Epic Records subsidiary 550 Music. The album was the first recording released on Tracey Edmonds' record label Yab Yum Records, which 550 Music distributed.

It includes the Grammy-nominated first single "Someone to Love" featuring Babyface. The song was originally featured on the soundtrack to the 1995 Will Smith and Martin Lawrence action-comedy Bad Boys. Also included is the second single "Pretty Girl" and the final single "Isn't It Scary".

Bonafide was a favorite of rapper Tupac Shakur. The two met each other by way of a mutual friend on the set of Shakur's video "How Do U Want It", which prompted them to work together. The end result was the collaboration "Are U Still Down", which appeared on Jon's following album Cool Relax.

The album was certified Gold.

Track listing
All songs written by Jonathan Buck, except where noted.
"Bonafide" – 4:26
"Simple Melody" (featuring Bootsy Collins) (Jonathan Buck, William Collins) – 3:58
"Love Is Candi" – 4:40
"Mystery 4 Two" – 4:58
"Someone to Love" (featuring Babyface) (Kenneth Edmonds) – 4:35
"Time After Time" – 5:47
"Overflow" – 5:00
"Pretty Girl" (Edmonds) – 4:18
"Pants Off" – 4:38
"Isn't It Scary" – 5:08
"Burning 4 You" – 5:52
"Gone Before Light" – 6:15
"Love Don't Do" – 6:45

Personnel
Credits adapted from liner notes and CD Universe.

 Jon B. – lead and backing vocals, drums, drum programming, piano, keyboards, bass 
 Babyface – backing vocals, drum programming, keyboards, guitar
 Deon Estus – bass
 Reggie Hamilton – guitar
 Ricardo Silveria – guitar
 Musiic K. Galloway – backing vocals
 Deborah Buck, Donald Buck, Kevin Buck – strings
 Tyrone Griffin – trumpet
 Randy Walker – MIDI programming
 Tracey Edmonds, Michael McQuarn – executive producer
 Brad Gilderman, Marty Ogden, Ricky Delena – recording engineer
 Dave Way, Tom Russo, Jon Gass, Mick Guzauski – mixing
 Herb Powers, Jr. – mastering
 George Holz – photography

Charts

Certifications

References

1995 debut albums
550 Music albums
Albums produced by Babyface (musician)
Jon B. albums